Tongoy Airport ,  was an airstrip serving Tongoy, a Pacific coastal town in the Coquimbo Region of Chile.

The airport is closed.

The Tongoy non-directional beacon (Ident: TOY) is located on the field.

See also

Transport in Chile
List of airports in Chile

References 

Defunct airports
Airports in Chile
Airports in Coquimbo Region